Benjamin Flint (12 January 1893 – 20 July 1959) was an English cricketer active from 1919 to 1924. He played for Nottinghamshire in thirteen first-class matches from 1920 to 1921. A right-arm fast bowler, he took 19 wickets at an average of 29.57. His son is Derrick Flint, who played a few times for Warwickshire in 1948 and 1949 and who later married Rachael Heyhoe Flint, England's successful woman cricketer of the 1960s and 1970s.

Notes

1893 births
1959 deaths
English cricketers
Nottinghamshire cricketers